Nanton was a provincial electoral district in Alberta, Canada, mandated to return a single member to the Legislative Assembly of Alberta from 1909 to 1926.

History

The Nanton electoral district was formed prior to the 1909 Alberta general election from a portion of the High River and Macleod electoral districts.

Prior to the 1930 Alberta general election, the Nanton electoral district was merged with a portion of the Claresholm electoral district to form the Nanton-Claresholm electoral district.

The electoral district was named for the Town of Nanton.

Election results

1909 general election

1913 general election

1917 general election

1921 general election

1926 general election

See also
List of Alberta provincial electoral districts
Nanton, Alberta, a town in southwest Alberta

References

Further reading

External links
Elections Alberta
The Legislative Assembly of Alberta

Former provincial electoral districts of Alberta